Child Whispers (published in 1922) is the first published work of the English children's author Enid Blyton, illustrated by her childhood friend and collaborator Phyllis Chase. It is a collection of 28 poems, and one of Blyton's most popular and best-known poetry books.

References

External links

 
Enid Blyton Society page

Books by Enid Blyton
1922 children's books
1922 poetry books
British children's books
English poetry collections
Children's poetry books
Debut books